Season 1 of Cardfight!! Vanguard, titled ,  aired in Japan beginning on January 8, 2011 and concluded on March 31, 2012, airing 65 episodes.

In July 2010, an anime television series based on the game was green-lit by TMS Entertainment under the directorial supervision of Hatsuki Tsuji. Music is composed by Takayuki Negishi while Mari Tominaga provided the character designs. The series was broadcast on TV Aichi and then by AT-X, TV Tokyo, TV Osaka, and TV Setouchi systems.  The media-streaming website Crunchyroll simulcasted the first season to the United States, Canada, the United Kingdom, and Ireland. Crunchyroll began streaming the second season to the United States, Canada, and the United Kingdom on June 30, 2012.

Twenty-five pieces of theme music are used for the series—nine opening themes and seventeen closing themes (one of which is exclusive to the English dub). The anime also features two insert songs performed by Ultra Rare (i.e. Suzuko Mimori, Yoshino Nanjō, and Aimi Terakawa, who are the original Japanese voice actresses of Kourin, Rekka, and Suiko). The two songs are "Miracle Trigger ~Tomorrow Will Be Ultra Rare!~" (ミラクルトリガー ~きっと明日はウルトラレア!~) (used in episodes 18, 26, and 115; simply known as "Miracle Trigger" in the English dub) and "Stand Up! DREAM" (スタンドアップ! DREAM) (used in episodes 39, 115, and 118).

An English dub co-produced by Ocean Productions (recorded at Blue Water Studios) began airing on Singapore's Okto channel from October 16, 2011, on Animax Asia from January 22, 2012, and on Malaysia's RTM-TV2 channel from November 18, 2012. Dubbed episodes also began being released on YouTube from May 29, 2012. The series can be seen legally on a dedicated channel for it created by Bushiroad, the original creators and manufacturers of the card game, and as of June 25 is available for viewing in most countries without geo-blocking.

While there are a few changes, the English dub adaption is mostly faithful to the original Japanese version. However, the most notable change in the English dub is that three opening themes and three ending themes are used. The only openings are English versions of the first opening theme "Vanguard" (from eps. 1-65), the third opening theme "Limit Break" (from eps. 66-104), and the fourth opening theme "Vanguard Fight" (from eps. 105 onward), all of which are still performed by their original respective artists.

The first ending theme used in the dub is an English version of the third ending theme "Dream Shooter" (from eps. 1-65) while the second ending theme is a unique song titled "Way To Victory" (from eps. 66-104), both of which are performed by Sea☆A. The ending credit sequence for this exclusive theme is the one used for the original sixth ending theme "Jōnetsu-ism". The third ending theme used in the dub is an English version of the original ninth ending song "Endless☆Fighter" (from eps. 105 onward), which is performed only by Aimi Terakawa in the dub. Similarly, the Ultra Rare insert songs are performed in English by Suzuko Mimori, Yoshino Nanjō, and Aimi Terakawa (the original Japanese voice actresses of Kourin, Rekka, and Suiko).

Individual episodes from seasons 1-4 are known as "Rides".

Plot
The protagonist of this story, Aichi Sendou, is a timid boy in his third year of middle school. He had been living his life looking backward rather than forward, trying not to stand out. However, he had one thing that kept him going: Blaster Blade, a card from a card game that was given to him when he was little. That card is the reason why he begins to engage in Card Fights, something that changes his life drastically.

The name of the card game is "Vanguard." The game takes place in a different planet called "Cray," and due to a never before seen play system, it becomes popular throughout the world.

Aichi, immediately attracted by Vanguard, meets friends such as Misaki Tokura and Kamui Katsuragi, along with other rivals. Through friendly rivalry with them, Aichi begins to enjoy a fulfilling life. Aichi, however, has a goal: to once again battle with a Vanguard Fighter by the name of Toshiki Kai. Kai is an aloof and cold-hearted high school student who has outstanding abilities in the world of Vanguard. He is also the reason why Aichi started playing the game. For him, Toshiki is the person who saved him from his boring life and introduced him to Vanguard. In order to get better at Vanguard, Aichi puts his soul into it every day. He wishes that someday, he'll be able to battle Toshiki and have him recognize his worth.

He soon learns about a power called PSY Qualia, and another boy called Ren Suzugamori, who also has the same power.

The original season of Cardfight!! Vanguard centers on main character Aichi Sendou's introduction to the titular card game. Over time, he makes new friends, competes in the National Championships, and confronts a mysterious power called Psyqualia .

Theme songs
Opening themes
 "Vanguard" by JAM Project (eps. 1–33) (eps. 1-65 in English dub)
 "Believe in My Existence" by JAM Project (eps. 34–65)
Ending themes
  by Natsuko Aso (eps. 1-15)
 "Smash Up!!" by Shīna Hekīru (eps. 16-25)
 "Dream Shooter" by Sea☆A (eps. 26-38) (eps. 1–65 in English dub)
 "Starting Again" by Sayaka Sasaki (eps. 39-52)
 "Nakimushi Treasures" by Saori Kodama featuring Milky Holmes (Suzuko Mimori, Izumi Kitta, Sora Tokui, and Mikoi Sasaki) (eps. 53-65)

Episode list

References

2011 Japanese television seasons
2012 Japanese television seasons
Cardfight!! Vanguard